Nagrota Assembly constituency may refer to 

 Nagrota, Jammu and Kashmir Assembly constituency
 Nagrota, Himachal Pradesh Assembly constituency